"All for You" is a song by British synthpop band Years & Years. It was released as a digital download and for streaming on 27 June 2018 as the third single from their second studio album Palo Santo. The song was written by Olly Alexander, Mark Ralph and Greg Kurstin.

Background
Olly Alexander said the song was "one to get deep on the dance floor and release your inner demons" referring to the feeling of relief after leaving a toxic lover. Talking about the song he also said, "We have devils and angels inside of us – the person we present to the world and the one we keep to ourselves; performing has always been a way for me to explore that. In Palo Santo, all your dreams come true and sometimes those dreams are full of monsters. 'All For You' is about reflecting on a past relationship and wondering if things were ever really as you thought they were, it's about how our identities change when we love somebody."

Music video
A music video to accompany the release of "All for You" was first released onto YouTube on 17 September 2018. The video was directed by Fred Rowson. Talking about the video Olly Alexander said, "I wanted the video to depict personal transformation, from a swan to a Witch to an Android and back again. The idea that there is a fixed 'authentic' you is false to me, we constantly shift and get reshaped by the people who experience us, whether we like it or not. I hope you like the video, we tried to make something that felt like a true pop video by way of planet Palo Santo, and we wanted to show you how androids are born."

Track listing

Personnel
Credits adapted from Tidal.
 Greg Kurstin – producer, composer, lyricist, associated performer, drums, music production, recording engineer, studio personnel, synthesizer
 Mark Ralph – composer, lyricist
 Olly Alexander – composer, lyricist, associated performer, vocals
 Emre Turkmen – associated performer, background vocalist
 John Davis – mastering engineer, studio personnel
 Michael Freeman – mix engineer, studio personnel
 Mike Stent – mixer, studio personnel
 Alex pasco – recording engineer, studio personnel
 Julian Burg – recording engineer, studio personnel

Charts

Certifications

Release history

References

 

2018 songs
2018 singles
Years & Years songs
Songs written by Olly Alexander
Songs written by Mark Ralph (record producer)
Songs written by Greg Kurstin
Song recordings produced by Greg Kurstin